The Liga Handebol Brasil 2019 (2019 Brazil Handball League) was the 23rd season of the top tier Brazilian handball national competitions for clubs, it is organized by the Brazilian Handball Confederation. For the 4th time Handebol Taubaté was crowned champion beating at the final EC Pinheiros.

Teams qualified for the play-offs
South Southeast Conference
 Handebol Taubaté
 EC Pinheiros
 Corinthians Guarulhos
Northeastern Conference
 Clube Português
 GHC CAIC

Play-offs

Final

References

External links
CBHb official web site

Bra